is a Japanese voice actress who works for Kenyu Office.

Her major roles include Kotonoha Katsura in School Days. Anzu Yukimura in Da Capo II, Hakuryu in Saiyuki Reload, and Chokaku in Koihime Musō.

Filmography

Anime

Video games

References

External links
  
 

Living people
Japanese video game actresses
Japanese voice actresses
Voice actors from Kagawa Prefecture
Year of birth missing (living people)